"Kukere" (Efik: "Don't think/worry") is a song by Nigerian singer Iyanya. It was released as the lead single from his second studio album, Desire (2013). Upon its release, the song peaked at number 1 on Top FM's May Chart, Soundcity's Viewers Choice, Rhythm FM, and The Beat 99.9 FM's Blackberry Top Ten Countdown. Moreover, it peaked at number 2 on Radio Port Harcourt. CEO Dancers performed the song during their performance on Britain's Got Talent. To further promote the album in London, Cokobar and Iyanya held the Kukere Queen Competition. Participants of the competition were asked to upload a dance video of themselves and state three reasons why they deserve to win.

Accolades
"Kukere" won Best Pop Single and was nominated for Song of the Year at The Headies 2012. It also won the Hottest Single of the Year award at the 2013 Nigeria Entertainment Awards, and was nominated for Best Contemporary Afro (Live Beats Choice) at the 2012 Nigeria Music Video Awards (NMVA). It was also nominated for Most Popular Song of the Year at the 2013 City People Entertainment Awards.

Track listing

 Digital single

Kukere Remix

The remix of Kukere features vocals from D'banj. It was released on 20 August 2012 as the third single from the Desire album. The song reprises the original hook and instrumental of Kukere.

Background
In an interview with Toolz, Iyanya said D'banj reached out to him to do the remix. He also said he was honored to work with D'banj. Furthermore, he said they would be shooting a video for the remix. However, the music video was never shot.

Critical reception
Upon its release, the remix received positive reviews from music critics. Ayo of Jaguda.com said, "Iyanya came, saw and conquered. He gave us one of the biggest dance track ever made, props to D'tunes for the crazy beat. After having a successful song, i bet you know there will be covers and remixes, and the master of Killing Songs, koko master jumps on this song with Iyanya." Damilare Aiki of BellaNaija said, "When Iyanya released Kukere in March 2012, it was no doubt that the song would quickly become a national anthem as it was a breath of fresh air from Iyanya, who had previously released other buzz worthy singles including Love Truly and I'm the One." Demola OG of NotJustOk added, "An already huge national track, Kukere is going to get bigger and move further. Iyanya gets D'banj on the Kukere remix and as you can imagine it is fiya."

Track listing
 Digital single

References

Iyanya songs
2012 songs
2012 singles
D'banj songs
Song recordings produced by D'Tunes